Eldon B. Tunstall Farm is a historic tobacco farm complex and national historic district located near Bullock, Granville County, North Carolina.  The farmhouse was built about 1907, and is a two-story, three bay, frame I-house, with a one-story full facade porch.  Also on the property are the contributing dairy, smokehouse, well house, log corn crib, log horse and mule barn, packhouse, striphouse, ordering house, garage, shop, chicken house, three V-notched log tobacco barns, and a former store.

It was listed on the National Register of Historic Places in 1988.

References

Tobacco buildings in the United States
Farms on the National Register of Historic Places in North Carolina
Historic districts on the National Register of Historic Places in North Carolina
Houses completed in 1907
Houses in Granville County, North Carolina
National Register of Historic Places in Granville County, North Carolina